Monon Township is one of twelve townships in White County, Indiana, United States. As of the 2010 census, its population was 3,282 and it contained 2,032 housing units.

History
Monon Township was established in 1836, and named after Big Monon Creek.

The first post office was established at Lee, aka Oakdale, on the Monon Railroad.

Geography

Cities, towns, villages
 Monon

Unincorporated towns
 Lee at 
(This list is based on USGS data and may include former settlements.)

Adjacent townships
 Salem Township, Pulaski County (north)
 Beaver Township, Pulaski County (northeast)
 Liberty Township (east)
 Union Township (southeast)
 Honey Creek Township (south)
 Princeton Township (southwest)
 Milroy Township, Jasper County (west)
 Hanging Grove Township, Jasper County (northwest)

Cemeteries
The township contains these three cemeteries: Bedford, Monon and Wilson.

Airports and landing strips
 Garwood Memorial Airport

Landmarks
 Bedford Cemetery
 Monon Park

Education
 North White School Corporation

Monon Township is served by the Monon Town & Township Public Library.

Political districts
 Indiana's 4th congressional district
 State House District 25
 State Senate District 07

References
 United States Census Bureau 2007 TIGER/Line Shapefiles
 United States Board on Geographic Names (GNIS)
 IndianaMap

External links
 Indiana Township Association
 United Township Association of Indiana

Townships in White County, Indiana
Townships in Indiana